"What Is This Heart?" is the third studio album by How to Dress Well released on June 23, 2014 on Weird World, an imprint of Domino. It is his highest-charting album peaking at number 145 on The Billboard 200.

The songs "A Power" and "What You Wanted" were co-written and co-produced by CFCF.

Title 
Krell described the album's title in a message on Twitter:

Critical reception 

"What Is This Heart?" received mostly positive reviews from contemporary music critics. At Metacritic, which assigns a normalized rating out of 100 to reviews from mainstream critics, the album received an average score of 69, based on 32 reviews, which indicates "generally favorable reviews".

Ian Cohen of Pitchfork gave a very positive review of the album, stating, ""What Is This Heart?" makes you initially susceptible and vulnerable, and that's risky when modern discourse seeks metaphorical blood, allowing people to disclose more than ever without actually revealing anything. So make no mistake, the title of this album is a challenge as well, as How to Dress Well's modern masterpiece is conducted with the most eternal transparency—Krell asks "what is this heart" and lets you look right into his own."

Track listing

References 

2014 albums
How to Dress Well albums
Domino Recording Company albums
Albums produced by Rodaidh McDonald
Lo-fi music albums
Experimental pop albums